Marestail (also mare's tail and mare's-tail) may refer to:

Plants
 Conyza canadensis, an annual weed also known as horseweed and Canadian fleabane
 Equisetum, a fern ally also known as horsetail and pipeweed
 Hippuris, a genus of aquatic flowering plants, including:
 Hippuris vulgaris, the common mare's-tail

Other
Mare's tail, a type of cirrus cloud formation

See also
 Grey Mare's Tail (disambiguation)